Mohammad Zehi (also Romanized as Moḩammad Zehī; also known as Moḩammad Zā’ī and Moḩammadzī) is a village in Polan Rural District, Polan District, Chabahar County, Sistan and Baluchestan Province, Iran. At the 2006 census, its population was 594, in 112 families.

References 

Populated places in Chabahar County